Tom Shipley may refer to:

 Tom Shipley (singer-songwriter) (born 1941), of American folk rock duo Brewer & Shipley 
 Tom Shipley (politician) (born 1953), Iowa state senator